Eugène Narbonne, born 1885 died 1973, was a figurative French painter and professor at the École nationale supérieure des beaux-arts in Paris.

He is also known for his students: Maurice Boitel, Hannes Rosenow, Georgette Piccon, Bernard Buffet and Louis Vuillermoz.

20th-century French painters
20th-century French male artists
French male painters
1885 births
1973 deaths
19th-century French male artists